The flag of Saint Petersburg, in the Russian Federation, is a red field charged in the centre with the arms of the city, which consists of two silver anchors (a sea anchor, and a river anchor), and a gold scepter.

The anchors both cross each other at their centers, with the sea anchor to the left and the river anchor on the right. They reflect the fact that the city has both river and sea ports. The scepter is surmounted on the anchors in the centre. It shows that the city was the former capital of Russia.

The flag was adopted on 6 September 1991. The proportions are 2:3.

References

External links
 Flags of the World

Flag
Saint Petersburg
Flags introduced in 1991